The Jewish Combat Organization (ŻOB;  Yidishe Kamf Organizatsie; often translated to English as the Jewish Fighting Organization) was a World War II resistance movement in occupied Poland, which was instrumental in organizing and launching the Warsaw Ghetto Uprising. ŻOB took part in a number of other resistance activities as well.

Offshoot of Jewish youth groups

The ŻOB was formed on 28 July 1942, six days after the German Nazis under SS General Jurgen Stroop began the Gross Aktion Warschau (aka the Grossaktion) sealing the fate of the Jews confined in the Warsaw Ghetto: "All Jewish persons living in Warsaw, regardless of age and gender, [would] be resettled in the East." Thus began massive "deportations" of about 254,000 Jews, all of whom were sent to the Treblinka extermination camp. The Gross Aktion lasted until 12 September 1942. Overall it reduced the once thriving Warsaw Jewish community of some 400,000 to a mere 55,000 to 60,000 inhabitants.

The youth groups that were instrumental in forming the ŻOB had anticipated German intentions to annihilate Warsaw Jewry and began to shift from an educational and cultural focus to self-defense and eventual armed struggle.

Unlike the older generation, the youth groups took these reports seriously and had no illusions about the true intentions of the Germans. A document published three months before the start of the deportations by Hashomer Hatzair declared: "We know that Hitler's system of murder, slaughter and robbery leads steadily to a dead end and the destruction of the Jews."

A number of the left Zionist youth groups, such as Hashomer Hatzair and Dror, proposed the creation of a self-defense organization at a meeting of Warsaw Jewish leaders in March 1942. The proposal was rejected by the Jewish Labour Bund who believed that a fighting organization would fail without the help of the Polish resistance. Others rejected the notion of armed insurgency saying that there was no evidence of a threat of deportation. Moreover, they argued any armed resistance would provoke the Germans to retaliate against the whole Jewish community.

In November 1942, ŻOB officially became part of and subordinated its activities to the High Command of the Armia Krajowa. In return the AK began providing ŻOB with weapons and training, with the first shipment of guns and ammunition being provided in December 1942. The organization was spied upon by Jewish collaborators with the Nazis called the "Society of Free Jews" (Towarzystwo Wolnych Żydow)

ŻOB resistance to the second deportation

On 18 January 1943, the Nazis began a second wave of deportations. The first Jews the Germans rounded up included a number of ŻOB fighters who had intentionally crept into the column of deportees. Led by Mordechai Anielewicz they waited for the appropriate signal, then stepped out of formation, and fought the Nazis with small arms. The column scattered and news of the ŻZW and ŻOB action quickly spread throughout the ghetto. During this small deportation, the Nazis only managed to round up about 5,000 to 6,000 Jews.

The deportations lasted four days during which the Germans met other acts of resistance from the ŻOB. When they left the ghetto on 22 January 1943, the remaining Jews regarded it as a victory, however Israel Gutman, a member of the ŻOB who subsequently became one of the leading authors on Jewish Warsaw wrote, "It [was] not known [to the Jews] that the Germans had not intended to liquidate the entire ghetto by means of the January deportations." However, Gutman concludes that the "[January] deportations... had a decisive influence on the ghetto's last months."

Final deportation and uprising

The final deportation began on the eve of Passover, 19 April 1943. The streets of the ghetto were vacant; most of the remaining 30,000 Jews were hiding in carefully prepared bunkers including their headquarters located in Ulica Miła 18, many of which had electricity and running water, however they offered no route of escape.

When the Germans marched into the ghetto, they met fierce armed resistance from fighters attacking from open windows in vacated apartments. The defenders of the ghetto utilized guerrilla warfare tactics and had the strategic advantage not only of surprise but also of being able to look down on their opponents. This advantage was lost when the Germans began systematically burning all of the buildings of the ghetto forcing the fighters to leave their positions and seek cover in the underground bunkers. The fires above consumed much of the available oxygen below ground, turning the bunkers into suffocating death traps.

By 16 May 1943, the German Police General Jürgen Stroop, who had been in charge of the final deportation, officially declared what he called the Grossaktion, finished. To celebrate he razed Warsaw's Great Synagogue. The ghetto was destroyed and what remained of the uprising was suppressed.

Epilogue

Even after the destruction of the ghetto, small numbers of Jews could still be found in the underground bunkers, on both sides of the ghetto wall. In fact, during the last months of the ghetto some 20,000 Jews fled to the Aryan side. Some Jews who escaped the final destruction of the ghetto, including youth group members and leaders Kazik Ratajzer, Zivia Lubetkin, Yitzhak Zuckerman and Marek Edelman, would participate in the 1944 Warsaw Uprising against the Nazis.

While many members and leaders of the youth groups perished in the Warsaw Ghetto, Zionist and non-Zionist youth movements remain active. One can still find the left Zionist youth groups Hashomer Hatzair and Habonim Dror in countries such as Argentina, Australia, Austria, Belgium, Brazil, Bulgaria, Canada, Chile, France, Germany, Hungary, Israel, Italy, Mexico, the Netherlands, Poland, South Africa, Switzerland, Ukraine, the United Kingdom, the United States and Uruguay. There are still remnants of the non-Zionist Jewish Labour Bund's S.K.I.F. in Australia, United Kingdom, France and United States. The right youth group Betar operates in Australia, Brazil, Western Europe and the United States, and Bnei Akiva, a religious Zionist organization, operates worldwide.

Similar Organizations
A second Jewish resistance organization called the Jewish Military Union (ŻZW), formed primarily of former officers of the Polish Army in late 1939, operated side by side with ŻOB & was also instrumental in the Jewish armed struggle.

References

External links

The Warsaw Ghetto Uprising on the Yad Vashem website

Anti-fascist organisations in Poland
Jewish anti-fascists
Military units and formations of Poland in World War II
National liberation movements
Polish anti-fascists
Warsaw Ghetto Uprising
Military units and formations established in 1942
Paramilitary organisations based in Poland
Polish underground organisations during World War II
Polish resistance during World War II
Jewish resistance during the Holocaust